Airton Ferreira da Silva, best known as Airton Pavilhão (31 October 1934 – 3 April 2012) was an association football defender.

Pavilhão was born and died in Porto Alegre, Brazil. In the course of his career (1949–1971), he played for Força e Luz, Grêmio, Santos and Cruz Alta Rio Grande do Sul. He won eleven Campeonato Gaúcho with Grêmio (from 1956 to 1960 and from 1962 to 1967).

References

1934 births
Sportspeople from Rio Grande do Sul
2012 deaths
Brazilian footballers
Association football defenders
Grêmio Foot-Ball Porto Alegrense players
Santos FC players